Bruce—Grey—Owen Sound is a provincial electoral district in western Ontario, Canada. It elects one member to the Legislative Assembly of Ontario.

It was created in 1999 from parts of Bruce and Grey when ridings in Ontario were redistributed to match their federal counterparts.

The riding from 1999 to 2007 included the municipalities of West Grey, Hanover, Chatsworth, Meaford, Owen Sound, Georgian Bluffs, Arran-Elderslie, South Bruce Peninsula, Northern Bruce Peninsula, Neyaashiinigmiing, Saugeen 29, plus the eastern half of Brockton and South Bruce plus the northern third of Grey Highlands.

In 2007, the riding gained the municipality of Southgate, the rest of Grey Highlands, but lost the parts of Brockton and South Bruce in the riding.

The riding is notable for running a Green Party of Ontario candidate who received 33.1% of the popular vote in the 2007 election, one of largest shares of the popular vote the party has ever received in a single riding.

Members

Election results

2007 electoral reform referendum

Sources

Elections Ontario Past Election Results

Ontario provincial electoral districts
Owen Sound